The following is list of characters the appear in the 2010 cartoon series, Generator Rex.

Main Characters

Rex Salazar
 Voice Actor: Daryl Sabara
Rex Salazar is a fifteen-year-old (sixteen in Season 3 due to six-month time skip) half-Argentinean, half-Mexican, human E.V.O born to a family of scientists. Unlike other E.V.O.s, Rex can control his nanites at will, allowing him to appear human and even cure other E.V.O.s of their mutations and use his nanites to create a variety of machines on his body and communicate with various technology as well as manipulate and control it to his will. Upon being injected with the specialized Omega Nanite, he developed the ability to create even stronger and more effective machinery, each possessing their own unique properties. He also became strong enough to cure animals of their tainted nanites, and detect the presence of the four-armed, portal-creating E.V.O. Breach. Despite being a ladies' man,his one-and-only girlfriend is a fellow human-looking siren-like E.V.O. named Circe who originally worked for his archenemy, but ultimately defected when she came to realize that Van Kleiss only desired Rex "alive" in body only. She then has joined his E.V.O. gang in Hong Kong, China. 
According to his archenemy, Van Kleiss, he has inherited his late Mexican mother Violetta's headstrong nature.

About six months into the future from Breach's newfound time-traveling ability, Rex is working against Providence's new boss, the power-mad Black Knight, to stop her and the Consortium from attaining infinite and boundless godhood from the merger five specialized nanites called "Meta Nanites" ("Master-Control Nanites") which only he alone could fully control in their purest state, as his late parents had secretly programmed just for him. He is now dating his very first girlfriend Circe, as their romantic relationship was fully revealed to be genuine in "Assault on Abysus", although fans quite disappointed there were not enough episodes for the couple to have many moments together long before the events of the two-part finale. Since then, he is now in a fully blossomed romance with Circe.

Agent Six
 Voice Actor: Wally Kurth

Agent Six is a senior Providence agent and Rex's handler. His name came from the fact that he is the sixth most dangerous person in the planet. Owing to Six's strict by-the-book personality, Rex goes as far as to refer to him as a "nanny, just more aggro." He always wears a green suit with a black tie and black sunglasses. As noted, Six likes to continually wear the same suit. It was shown that Six had brown eyes. He came to fall for Dr. Rebecca Holiday, confessing his feelings for her in "A Family Holiday" and seemed to regain them regardless losing six years of his memory in "Six Minus Six."

Bobo Haha
 Voice Actor: John DiMaggio

Bobo Haha is an E.V.O. chimp with the ability to speak. He is also Rex's sidekick and friend. He wears an eye patch and fez.

Bobo also claimed that before he was turned into an E.V.O., he was a helper animal trained to entertain children at a hospital. His owner was supposedly an eccentric philanthropist.

Dr. Rebecca Holiday
 Voice Actress: Grey DeLisle
Dr. Rebecca Holiday is the lead scientist for Providence, a position she earned due to her expertise in nanotechnology. Along with Agent Six, she is responsible for taking care of Rex and takes her job very seriously, constantly monitoring Rex to ensure his safety. She also harbors a crush on Six, which he eventually grows to reciprocate in "A Family Holiday" and starts to recall said feelings in "Riddle of the Sphinx" since losing his memories in "Si Minus Six."

Noah Nixon
 Voice Actor: Fred Savage

Noah Nixon is a normal human and Rex Salazar's best friend. In the beginning it was revealed that he is an agent sent by White Knight to befriend Rex and subtly influence his decisions to make him more compliant. Noah eventually revealed to Rex his status as a covert agent and they became friends on open terms. His girlfriend is his high school classmate Claire Bowman.

White Knight
 Voice Actor: J. K. Simmons

White Knight is the leader of Providence. He also is the only known nanite-free being on the planet: he almost always stays in his white sterile office, communicating his orders only through two-way screens. He has a Mysophobia-like fear of nanites, he doesn't want to touch or even be near E.V.O.s because he fears they will infect him with nanites, and therefore has donned a nanite-free battle suit that he constantly wears in the third and last season. In the five years after the Event, he had short pale brown hair and was a skilled agent for Providence working under Dr. Fell and was the closest partner of Six.

Antagonists

Van Kleiss
 Voice Actor: Troy Baker
Van Kleiss is the primary antagonist of the show, a British scientist who specializes in biointerface and biomechanical integration. Van Kleiss appears to know about Rex and his forgotten boyhood past, and knows what caused the nanite incident five years prior was Rex's own teenage older brother Cesar. He saw the Nanite Event as the dawn of a new golden age for further evolved humankind, and seeks to create a planet populated solely by E.V.O.s. regardless of their weakness or frailties. Like Rex, he is able to control his nanites, but his mutation is quite unstable and requires a constant supply of fresh nanites for survival by extracting them from fellow E.V.O.s., who are petrified in the process. Upon acquiring Rex's batch of fully programmed original nanites, he gained the opposing ability to actually create E.V.O.s and have them under his control; a mutation which becomes permanent if not cured by Rex in less than an hour. This newfound ability of his only lasted since "Payback" and the entirety of the nineteen-episode second season. 

Since further increasing Breach's portal-making ability from the amp pack he himself had made for her, who had suddenly sent him back into the ancient past, Van Kleiss had endured the primitive eras of Egypt, and met Emperor Septimus Severus of Ancient Rome. Managing to create an Egyptian E.V.O. called G'raan Set in a makeshift laboratory, he then preserved himself in a hibernation chamber that stored his ever decreasing unstable nanties and ensured that he was able to remain alive as the present timeline passed, leaving him with a full-blown beard and mustache. He had then expressed insanity to mask his equally evil and ambitious nature until he could absorb the five Meta Nanites into. Having planned to attain godly abilities since the very beginning, it was he who had caused the deaths of Cesar and Rex's parents, Rafael and Violetta, by trapping them inside as the nanite reactor exploded. Having failed, his golden gauntlet was destroyed and he was taken to Breach's pocket dimension of Greenville, Ohio.

The Pack
The Pack is a group of E.V.O.s that serve under the British E.v.o. scientist Van Kleiss. Its known members include the following:

Biowulf
 Voice Actor: Troy Baker

Biowulf is a blue-armored, white-haired, werewolf-like E.V.O. with enormous claws, who is fiercely loyal to Van Kleiss, whom he calls "master." Owing to Van Kleiss' powers being limited to his native soil in early episodes, Biowulf initially acts as the Pack's de facto leader in the field.

Skalamander
 Voice Actor: John DiMaggio
Skalamander is a large humanoid lizard-like E.V.O. with crystal spikes growing out of his body, four short stubby legs and a crystal club growing out of his left arm.

ZAG-RS
 Voice Actress: Grey DeLisle

ZAG-RS is a sentient and autonomous, self-aware  artificial intelligence/multi-agent system whose goal is to destroy the nanite infestation of Earth, thus all of humanity in the process. Its origin and motives are initially left mysterious, but it is able to exert control over the nanites at very short ranges. It made several different attempts to achieve its goal but was thwarted both every time by Rex. Its feminine voice was modeled after the deceased Mexican scientist Dr. Violetta Salazar's, as its inventor (the-then-teenage Dr. Cesar Salazar) had wanted it to have a voice that represented safety, protection and caring; all the feelings of a loving mother.

Agent Weaver
 Voice Actor: Troy Baker

Agent Weaver is a former member of Providence stationed at the arctic "Paradise" base where he was the chief technician. He and his crew were revealed to be traitors who were reactivating and selling nanites to Van Kleiss.

Hunter Cain
 Voice Actor: John Cena (1st Time), John DiMaggio (2nd Time)

Hunter Cain is an E.V.O. hunter who despises all E.V.O.s under all circumstances as he went insane after his wife became E.V.O. He uses a weapon loaded with special bullets that forces Nanites to self-destruct, vaporizing an E.V.O in an instant. First appearing in "The Hunter", he disrupts Rex from curing an E.V.O.

NoFace
 Voice Actor: Fred Tatasciore

NoFace is a supremely powerful and vengeful faceless E.V.O. with the ability to communicate with intelligent E.V.O.s and control the less intelligent ones. During the nanite event, the Gulf Stream funneled a huge amount of active nanites into the city of Kyiv, Ukraine, transforming nearly all that lived there into extremely powerful E.V.O.s. Among them was their current leader, NoFace.

Quarry
 Voice Actor: Mark Hamill (1st Time), John DiMaggio (2nd Time)

Quarry is an E.V.O. crime lord who is made of rock. He would hunt down and force E.V.O.s like Tuck, Skwydd, and Cricket to work for him through having gathered a massive criminal empire. In "Rabble", he learned of Rex's return from his enforcer Knuckles after Rex drained him of his nanites. Quarry had to dispose of Knuckles after that. He reappeared in "Hard Target" when he was released by Breach, but ended up being taken to Abysus and tortured extensively by an unhappy Van Kleiss. His final appearance is in Episode 52 "Remote Control" when he had a larger appearance due to what Van Kleiss had done to him, and mind-controlled Sqwydd, Tuck and Cricket to attack Rex once again. He was ultimately beaten by Rex and had his whole stone body blown apart, leaving only his head and fate known.

Gatlocke
 Voice Actor: Greg Ellis
He is a British cyborg who is a leader of a group of modern-day pirates known as "The Anarchists" who debuted in Episode 20 "Badlands."  He eventually makes his second and last appearance in Episode 59 "Enemies Mine" to take out Rex once and for all by aligning himself with Hunter Cain, NoFace and Valve whose fates are unknown since they were trapped inside a shield that was made by Rex's surplus nanites at Purgatory Base.

Black Knight
 Voice Actress: Jennifer Hale

Black Knight is the next Providence leader after White Knight rebelled against his superiors in the Consortium. When she took over Providence, she started to run things very differently from the way White Knight had. She believes in controlling the incurable E.V.O.s as rather than trying to cure them, Rex in particular. She secretly attempts to become a almighty goddess by attaining all five Meta Nanites for herself, even turning on her own superiors. She is eventually captured off screen.

Valve
 Voice Actor: Maurice LaMarche

Valve is a samurai-styled biker and a dealer of an altered form of nanites which can link a person to technology. He eventually makes his second and last appearance was in Episode 59 "Enemies Mine" to take out Rex once and for all by aligning himself with Hunter Cain, NoFace and Gatlocke whose fates are unknown since they were trapped inside a shield that was made by Rex's surplus nanites at Purgatory Base.

Gharun Set
 Voice Actor: Hakeem Kae-Kazim
Technically the very first E.V.O. ever created, Gharun Set was an ancient Egyptian created by British scientist Van Kleiss when Breach sent him back in time to ancient Egypt. Somehow being able to create a nanite production chamber, what Set calls the "engines of life" Van Kleiss infused them into Gharun Set, changing his appearance into a dog-headed mummy-like humanoid with an eye in the center of his chest.

The Consortium
The Consortium is a powerful organization which supports Providence and are the superiors of Black Knight. Little is known about this organization, but they seem to provide funding for Providence and the Nanite Project. In six years, they had finally managed to merge with four of the five almighty Meta Nanites, turning into biomechanical robots with strong powers ranging from teleportation, pyrokinesis and cryokinesis, and electromagnetic-controlling abilities.

Reddick
 Voice Actor: Robin Atkin Downes

Reddick is a real estate agent and construction associate who is a member of the Consortium. When merged with a Meta-Nanite, he was transformed into a gray hulking robot E.V.O. with the ability to control gravity and fly.

Roswell
 Voice Actor: Troy Baker

Roswell is a southern businessman and oil and mineral associate who is a member of the Consortium. When merged with the Meta-Nanite, he became a red and blue-armored E.V.O. with powers that enabled him to control both fire and ice.

Sir Anthony Haden-Scott
 Voice Actor: Robin Atkin Downes

Sir Anthony Haden-Scott is a British worldwide media associate and a member of the Consortium. After being injected with the Meta-Nanite, he became an E.V.O. with dark gray armor with orange lightning strikes on it and had the ability to manipulate matter and energy as well as the ability to fly.

Xanubian
Xanubian is an African American arms dealer and shipping industry associate who is a member of the Consortium. When merged with a Meta-Nanite, he was transformed into a thin tall robot E.V.O with green armor and had the ability to manipulate time and space. Unlike the others, he is mute, although Roswell calls him a chatterbox.

Vostok
 Voice Actor: John DiMaggio

Vostok is a black market financier and KGB operative who is a member of the Consortium. He was with the Consortium when Black Knight brought about her plans to restart the Nanite project. Vostok had some doubts about Black Knight's plot causing Black Knight to kill him when they were alone. Black Knight told the other Consortium members that the enemy was responsible for Vostok's death.

Alpha
 Voice Actor: Michael Emerson

Alpha was created by Caesar to control other nanites as a sentient being, but its energy/nanite body was unsustainable. Alpha tried to make mechanical bodies to sustain itself and that failed, so instead it tried to use living organic bodies as hosts. It is equivalent to the immensely powerful Omega Nanite/fifth Meta Nanite harboring within Rex's body. He is ultimately taken back to the Null Void by Benjamin Tennyson (in the form of Upchuck) and escapes his metallic prison as the Omega Nanite is re-injected inside Rex.

Supporting Characters

Diane Farrah
 Voice Actress: Grey DeLisle
Diane Farrah is a newswoman who hosts a news program called "Ultimate Exposure". She appears regularly at the places where Providence fights EV.O.s, as a hostess of her program or when she's having interviews with people involved with E.V.O.s.

Breach
 Voice Actress: Hynden Walch
Breach is a four-armed human E.V.O. girl. Using her larger arms, Breach can tear open space and time, creating red wormholes; golden since her spacial-based abilities were boosted by Van Kleiss' amp pack. Her portals also seem to have a plane, as those who go through them can stand within the portal without having to step out on either of the linked locations. Her own personal place is Greenville, Ohio, which she had absorbed into a portal and keeps as her own dollhouse that keeps her sane. It was where she had taken Biowulf, Skalamander and Van Kleiss, so they could escape the infinitely powerful curing cosmic wave Rex had made.

Circe
 Voice Actress: Tara Sands
Circe is a dark-haired humanoid teenage E.V.O. with strong sound-based abilities and the ability to lure fellow E.V.O.s like to a siren's song, who debuted in the third episode, "Beyond the Sea", in which she and Rex began to feel a powerful connection form between them, though she still chose the Pack over staying with Rex, as she did not trust Providence's methods. She met up with Rex during her very first mission as Van Kleiss' loyal subordinate in "Leader of the Pack" where she had hesitantly knocked Rex unconscious and had him imprisoned, albeit with a sad expression on her face for resorting to hurt him to help her master. She was the only one who showed any real leniency towards Rex, and looked away from him in disappointment as she left with the Pack after her master's plan had failed. 

A few weeks after the unexpected demise of Van Kleiss in "Dark Passage", in Episode 15 "What Lies Beneath", Circe had called Rex for his help in dealing with a crumbling Abysus due to her master's strong link with the unstable nanites being lost. When Rex learned that it was all about returning Van Kleiss to life, she had tried to reassure Rex that she needed him as much she needed Van Kleiss. She was concerned for Rex's safety when he rashly attempted to deal with the source head on, as it was causing him great pain. As she was about to be swept away the unstable nanites goop, she held onto Rex with tears of love in her eyes. After regaining consciousness in Rex's arms, she said that she was happy to see him. Thanking Rex for saving her life, she still refused to leave Van Kleiss, no matter how she cared for Rex, as it keeps things interesting.

Her second and final mission with the Pack was in the Bug Jar when she discovered, to her horror, that Van Kleiss was more interested in what Rex's body would give him, not caring in the least of what would happen to the boy's psyche. This was the final straw for Circe, enough that she left to join Rex's old friends in Hong Kong, China, where she seemed to have developed a close friendship with Sqywdd. This made Rex feel very uncomfortable and jealous until she assured him they were merely good friends on a strictly platonic level and nothing more. She and Cricket began to get out of any further "dates" by doing their hair and nails every weekend.   

Half a year into the not-too-distant future, in "Assault on Abysus", she was asked to help bring Rex throughout Abysus to procure a Meta Nanite before Black Knight could, she had told Rex that there was nothing between them except the mission. In the end, however, she finally confessed her true romantic feelings for Rex in a passionate kiss before she got herself taken by New Providence for him, which affected Rex very much. In "Mind Games", her form was taken on by the shapeshifting E.V.O. John Scarecrow (an former partner-in-crime of Rex's) to mess with Rex's emotions. She was seen in a prison cell with a muzzle gagging her mouth. 

Unfortunately the series had ended long before she and Rex's romance could be explored more fully in many more episodes before the events of "Endgame, Part 1", which disappoints fans greatly; she was in just nine episodes. In "Endgame, Part 2" once cured along with the rest of humanity, a glad and tearful Circe let a worried Rex hug her and put her arms around him; assuring him that she was "normal but okay" and jokingly saying that he had "put himself out of a job" by curing the world with his recently attained godly abilities from being one with all five Meta Nanites. It is confirmed that they are indeed dating.

Claire Bowman and Annie
A pair of "normal" teenage girls that go on double dates with Rex and Noah. They're both scientific prodigies and Annie has notoriously dangerous bad luck. So bad that Noah recruited Rex to go out with her because he didn't think anybody else could survive the experience.

Claire Bowman
 Voice Actress: Danica McKellar
Claire is a girl that Noah likes. Claire is best friends with a clumsy girl name Annie. In "Operation: Wingman", Claire agrees to go to the prom with Noah only if he can find Annie a date.

Annie
 Voice Actress: Felicia Day
Annie is a good friend of Claire Bowman's. Owing to Annie's preternatural clumsiness, she had a difficult time finding a date for junior prom. Noah persuaded Rex to come to the prom as his "wingman" and take Annie out as well. Since then, Annie has doubled dated with Rex more than once, by the end of the "Hermanos" episode Rex called that Annie, Claire, and Noah, are his true companions and he considered them as his family.

Rex's Old E.V.O. Street Gang
This is an E.V.O. street gang that live in Hong Kong, China. It was revealed that Rex was the leader of this gang in his early teenage years before he lost his memory and joined Providence.

Tuck
 Voice Actor: Dante Basco
Tuck is a red-eyed mummy-like E.V.O. who befriended a young Rex in Hong Kong, China, in the five years after the Nanite Event. He is best friends with Sqywdd and Cricket, and had faithfully followed Rex as their leader, even when encountering the shapeshifting E.V.O. John Scarecrow at one point during their adventures of freedom. He appeared in just five episodes throughout the show.

Skwydd
 Voice Actor: Jason Marsden
Skwydd (originally named Walter)is a humanoid squid E.V.O. who is seen to be pretty much of the serious type, giving Rex serious/obvious answers when Rex jokes around. Skwydd is shown to be rather moody and rarely smiles, something Rex jokes about. Skwydd has an interest in entertaining people as a freak show act. In "Hard Target", a deeply uncomfortable Rex had assumed that he and his siren-like sweetheart Circe were dating, but was quite relieved when he assured Rex that they were just friends and nothing more. He ended up being under Quarry's control once again by being collared by New Providence in "Remote Control" but is ultimately cured in "Endgame, Part 2" and goes by "Walter" again; he had brown hair and eyes. He appeared in six episodes.

Cricket
 Voice Actress: Vyvan Pham
Cricket, as her name states, is a Cricket-like E.V.O. who is the only female member of Rex's street gang at Hong Kong, China, during his younger years as a preteen. She becomes good friends with fellow E.V.O. Circe, having another girl to "even out the boy-girl ratio." She appeared in just five episodes in the show; she was ultimately cured by Rex's nanite-powered godly abilities in "Endgame, Part 2."

Rex Salazar's Hispanic Family

Dr. Rafael Salazar
Voice Actor: Carlos Alazraqui
He was the Argentinean scientist father of Cesar and Rex from Buenos Aires, who had worked on the original Nanite Project five (six years ago in the third and last season) years ago with his Mexican wife, and their equally intelligent teenage son Cesar. He was tall, handsome, had a black mustache, black eyes and short back sleek hair. Once settling down in Geneva,Switzerland, he became a father to his youngest son Rex.

About one decade later, he ,his wife and teenage eldest son began work on the Nanite project with fellow scientists Dr. Gabriel Rylander, Dr. Peter Meecham and Dr. Van Kleiss in Abysus at the behest of the Consortium. Unfortunately, he was ultimately killed alongside his dear wife due to the devious and ambitious Dr. Van Kleiss trapping him inside the exploding nanite reactor as the incomplete nanites scattered all across the Earth. His office is still intact, in which a young Rex had drawn pictures and had, as a teenager, recovered a framed photograph of himself and his late father's hand on his shoulder. Cesar also has a picture of himself and a younger Rex with him as well. His family has an ancestral ranch in his home country of Argentina, which his surviving sons' have inherited since his death, as seen in "Hermanos."

Dr. Violetta Salazar
Voice Actor: Grey DLisle
She was the late Mexican wife of fellow Latino scientist Dr. Rafael Salazar, she had eventually married him and bore him two sons, Cesar and Rex, whom she loved dearly. She was slim, with shoulder-length straight black hair, black eyes, and donned glasses. She was from Mexico City, Mexico, where she, her husband and sons had spent their summer at a local town run by a woman they considered as an abuela regardless of blood ties, where young Rex had befriended Frederico.She had traveled all over the world with her husband and teenage son Cesar, but had settled down once she had given birth to Rex in Geneva, Switzerland. At the family's ancestral rancho in Argentina (the home country of her husband), she had once held the video camera as her husband was telling a young Rex how the nanites would change the world for the better one day, and that he would be there to see it. She had told the teenage Cesar to stop his work for one moment and hold the camera for her.

She had agreed to work on the Nanite Project with her husband and eldest son's help in Abysus slongside fellow scientists Dr. Gabriel Rylander (whom she had chosen to be Rex's godfather), Dr. Peter Meechum and Van Kleiss; the only female on the team who had donned glasses. Unfortunately, alongside her husband, she had instantly died from to being trapped inside the lab that harbored the unstable nanite reactor due to the devious and ambitious Van Kleiss locking her in, as the teenage Cesar, ten-year-old Rex, Dr. Meechum and Dr. Rylander had managed to escape the colossal explosion of the four-out-of-five Meta Nanites and hundreds of uncontrollable, overly underdeveloped nanites spreading throughout the world and bonded with human and animal physiology alike. 
 
Because she had been a motherly symbol of safety, caring and protection, her eldest son Cesar had modeled the autonomous artificial intelligence Zag-RS' voice from hers. According to Van Kleiss, she was quite headstrong like Rex is. Unlike her husband, she appeared in less episodes as she is not seen in any pictures kept by her two surviving children; seen only as cameos in flashbacks about her working on the Nanite Project

Dr. Caesar Salazar
 Voice Actor: Freddy Rodriguez
Dr. Caesar Salazar is Rex's long-lost Argentinian/Mexican older brother in his late twenties (middle or late teens during the Nanite Project five/six years previously) and one of the surviving scientists of the Nanite Project alongside Dr. Peter Meecham, Van Kleiss and Dr. Gabriel Rylander, who he managed to partially return to life as the old man had just been molecularity scattered. With his parents, he had secretly programmed the five Meta Nanites to obey no one but his younger brother alone, as the fifth and strongest was injected into fifteen-year-old Rex by Dr. Rylander (known as "the Omega Nanite" in "Dark Passage") who had perished alongside Van Kleiss.

For many months, Ceaser had kept his cover in giving the all-powerful God Code to Rex, even if it meant appearing as an enemy in his younger brother's eyes until it was revealed that he was merely playing along Black Knight's schemes for world domination in order for Rex to acquire the Meta nanites unlimited godly abilities in full. He has a photograph of a younger Rex and himself with their late Argentinian father Rafael, which was never shown.

Other characters

Benjamin Kirby Tennyson
 Voice Actor: Yuri Lowenthal

Ben Tennyson is a sixteen-year-old teenager who wields the supremely powerful Level 20 extraterrestrial technology Ultimatrix, formerly the Omnitrix one year ago. He arrived in Rex's world through a space-time rift from the Null Void. It is he who returns the rouge sentient and autonomous Alpha Nanite to its interdimensional prison as Upchuck.

Humungousaur
 Voice Actor: Dee Bradley Baker

Humungousaur is a Vaxasaurian, a large brown alien that possesses incredible strength and dinosaur-like features. He can also grow up to a certain extent in size, with an additional increase in strength.

Diamondhead
 Voice Actor: Dee Bradley Baker

Diamondhead is a Petrosapien, an alien that has crystalline features and can grow crystals at will. He is also able to reshape his limbs, such as turning his arm into a sharp blade, as well as firing sharp crystals as projectiles at his opponents. Additionally, he is capable of using his crystals defensively, such as creating crystal walls to protect himself and his allies.

Lodestar
 Voice Actor: Dee Bradley Baker

Lodestar is a Biotsavartian, an alien with a floating metal head in between two sharp shoulders that act as a magnetic field. He has crab-like claws and his body is mainly black with yellow feet, hands, shoulders and chest. He possesses the power to control magnetic forces, moving metals and other magnetic objects of all different types.

Rath
 Voice Actor: John DiMaggio

Rath is an Appoplexian, a humanoid alien that is similar to a bipedal tiger. He can retract two short blades from behind his knuckles that allow his punches to be more effective. Rath, like all other Appoplexians, is known for his arrogance and aggressiveness.

Big Chill
 Voice Actor: Dee Bradley Baker

Big Chill is a Necrofriggian, a humanoid, asexual, moth-like alien whose wings and antenna can fold up into a hooded robe. He has a black body with blue and white spots, resembling ice chunks, on his limbs. He is capable of exhaling a freezing vapor that can encase his targets in a thick layer of ice. Big Chill can also render himself intangible. He can combine these abilities to freeze objects he passes through.

Cannonbolt
 Voice Actor: Dee Bradley Baker

Cannonbolt is an Arburian Pelarota, a round alien that can curl into a ball. He can accelerate himself in this state, allowing him to burst off very quickly at his opponents. He has a yellow "shell" which enables him to defend himself. His body is mostly colored white with black stripes.

XLR8
 Voice Actor: Yuri Lowenthal

XLR8 is a Kineceleran from the planet Kinet, and one of Ben's fastest aliens. He has a black body with a blue striped tail, and a spiked helmet with a blue visor. He has wheels on his feet, and leaves a track of black and blue lines when he runs.

Four Arms
 Voice Actor: Dee Bradley Baker

Four Arms is a Tetramand, a four-armed, red-skinned alien with four yellow eyes. He wears gold gauntlets on his arms and wears long black pants with a gold belt. He wears the Ultimatrix symbol on his chest.

Shocksquatch
 Voice Actor: David Kaye

Shocksquatch is a Gimlinopithecus from the planet Pattersonea. He is an alien with a yellow yeti-like appearance who can manipulate and emit yellow electric currents from his mouth. He was unlocked during the battle with Alpha in the Bug Jar.

Upgrade
 Voice Actor: Yuri Lowenthal

Upgrade is a Galvanic Mechamorph, a humanoid alien that has black skin with green mechanical prints throughout his body. He possesses the ability to manipulate and enhance technology.

Upchuck
 Voice Actor: Dee Bradley Baker

Upchuck is a Gourmand, a reptilian-like being who can digest, and then expel, energy and solid matter. Ben used him to carry the Alpha Nanite's compressed sphere into the Null Void.

Gwen Tennyson
 Voice Actress: Ashley Johnson

At some point in Gwen Tennyson's life, she teamed up with Ben, Kevin, and her grandfather, becoming a plumber. Gwen accompanied Ben and Kevin to Japan, where Ben would make a commercial for Mr. Smoothie. When she met Rex, she seemed to be impressed by what Ben had told her about his abilities. Later, Gwen opened a portal to Rex's universe for Rex and Bobo to return home.

Max Tennyson
 Voice Actor: Paul Eiding

Max Tennyson is the paternal grandfather of Ben and Gwen. Despite his age, Max has shown on multiple occasions to be a formidable fighter. He was once in the United States Army, an astronaut program, and was a plumber. Before Ben got the Omnitrix, Max tried to keep the Plumbers and the aliens a secret from his family because he wanted to protect them and he did not want this life for his family; however, his plan failed when the Omnitrix and Vilgax came to Earth.

Kevin Levin
 Voice Actor: Greg Cipes

Kevin Levin and Gwen accompanied Ben to Japan for advertising in Mr. Smoothie. Later he had a discussion with Rex when Rex thought Gwen was Ben's girlfriend. However, Gwen and Ben are cousins. Gwen is Kevin's girlfriend, and Kevin becomes jealous when Rex briefly flirts with her.

Kevin is able to absorb the properties of solid matter due to his Osmosian heritage (a race of aliens that are capable of absorbing energy, DNA and matter). He is able to adapt any solid matter to his body and make it an "armor" that protects him and enhances his strength. In addition, he is capable of transforming his hands into any weapon with the absorbed material.

Beverly Holiday
 Voice Actress: Jennifer Stone

Beverly Holiday is Dr. Holiday's younger sister, she turned into a spider-like E.V.O. when she was thirteen. She is kept in "The Hold", a containment area meant to hold the most dangerous creatures of the Petting Zoo, and Dr. Holiday has been trying to find a cure ever since.

Peter Meechum
 Voice Actors: Jeff Bennett (1st Time), Wil Wheaton (2nd Time)

Peter Meechum is a man who was turned into a zombie-like E.V.O. in which while his human body was exposed, a blob-shaped head is on top of him with his actual head in the other head's mouth. In this form, he had the ability to turn anyone he touches that have nanites in them into zombie-like creatures that obey his every command.

Dr.Gabriel Rylander 
 Voice Actor: Brent Spiner

Dr. Gabriel Rylander is a scientist who worked on the Nanite Project with Rex's parents and other scientists. Rylander, one of the original Nanite Project scientists, wanted to change the Earth with the nanites, ending starvation and disease. After an accident, he took part in Rex's nanite treatment.

Kenwyn Jones
 Voice Actress: Rutina Wesley

Kenwyn Jones is a former Providence cadet.

Providence was responsible for saving her family. Kenwyn later joined it because she wanted to repay her debt to them. The experience seemed to have a profound effect on her, causing her to take her training very seriously.

The Six
The Six are a group of mercenaries that consists of the six most dangerous people on the Earth. Each member's name goes by how dangerous they are. As noted by Six, the ranking focuses on how dangerous they are which in turn is determined by skill level and personality.

One
 Voice Actor: Frank Welker

One was the most dangerous man on the planet and the leader.

Dos
 Voice Actor: Carlos Alazraqui

Dos is an elderly Spanish gentleman, and is the second most dangerous man on the planet.

Trey
 Voice Actor: Jim Cummings

Trey is a large man with a cajun accent, who is physically the strongest of The Six.

IV
 Voice Actor: Frank Welker

IV (=pronounced like ivy) is a mummy-like mercenary, because he has bandages covering his body, that he uses as a weapon, it seems he is able to control them. He can use them to bind opponents and can even use them to his very own aid.

Five
 Voice Actress: Olivia d'Abo

Five a is a pink-haired Cockney accented English rocker girl as shown by her unique sense of fashion and guitar.

Fitzy Feakins
 Voice Actor: Tom Kenny

Fitzy Feakins  is a human E.V.O., who is urgently wanted by Providence because of his E.V.O. powers.

References

External links
 Official website

Child superheroes
Fictional shapeshifters
Generator Rex
Generator Rex characters
Generator Rex characters
Television characters introduced in 2010
2010s television-related lists
Animated characters introduced in 2010